Ashfield Sports Club is an Australian semi-professional football club based in the suburb of Ashfield, Perth, Western Australia, and founded in 1970. The club will compete in 2022 in the Football West State League Division 2.

History
Formed in 1970 the club was first named Ashfield Dynamo after its location in an industrial area. A dynamo is a machine that produces energy, so was a fitting name for the newly founded, "energetic" club. It competed in the Semi Professional League Division 2 in 1976. Following the Australian Soccer Federation decision to ban all ethnic names at all levels of competition, the club was renamed Ashfield Soccer and Sports Club. The fact that "Dynamo" was not ethnically linked in any way, seemed to be forgotten by the governing body at the time. In 1996 a partnership with Bunbury Tricolore, saw the name changed to Ashfield-Bunbury and the club won its first title in 1998. In 2001 Bunbury Soccer Club decided to strike out on their own (as South West Phoenix FC) and the name changed back to Ashfield Soccer and Sports Club. This did not deter the club, as they won their second title in the same year. 2010 saw the name shortened to Ashfield Sports Club.

Honours

First Division Winners – 1998 (Ashfield/Bunbury), 2001 (Ashfield)
First Division Runners Up – 2006, 2007, 2014, 2015
Third Division Winners – 1988
Cup Runners Up – 2013
Night Series Lower Division Runners Up – 2007, 2010

Season history

References

Soccer clubs in Perth, Western Australia
Football West State League teams
Association football clubs established in 1970
1970 establishments in Australia